Varṇa, in the context of Hinduism, refers to a social class within a hierarchical caste system. The ideology is epitomized in texts like Manusmriti, which describes and ranks four varnas, and prescribes their occupations, requirements and duties, or Dharma.
Brahmins: Vedic scholars, priests or teachers.
Kshatriyas: Rulers, administrators or warriors.
Vaishyas: Agriculturalists, farmers or merchants.
Shudras: Artisans, laborers or servants.

Communities which belong to one of the four varnas or classes are called savarna Hindus. The Dalits and tribals who do not belong to any varna were called avarna.

This quadruple division is a form of social stratification, quite different from the more nuanced system Jātis which correspond to the European term "caste".

The varna system is discussed in Hindu texts, and understood as idealised human callings. The concept is generally traced to the Purusha Sukta verse of the Rig Veda.

The commentary on the Varna system in the Manusmriti is often cited. Counter to these textual classifications, many Hindu texts and doctrines question and disagree with the Varna system of social classification.

Etymology and origins 
The Sanskrit term varna is derived from the root , meaning "to cover, to envelop, count, classify consider, describe or choose".

The word appears in the Rigveda, where it means "colour, outward appearance, exterior, form, figure or shape". The word means "color, tint, dye or pigment" in the Mahabharata. Varna contextually means "colour, race, tribe, species, kind, sort, nature, character, quality, property" of an object or people in some Vedic and medieval texts. Varna refers to four social classes in the Manusmriti.

The Vedas 
The earliest application to the formal division into four social classes (without using the term varna) appears in the late Rigvedic Purusha Sukta (RV 10.90.11–12), which has the Brahman, Rajanya (instead of Kshatriya), Vaishya and Shudra classes forming the mouth, arms, thighs and feet at the sacrifice of the primordial Purusha, respectively:

Some modern indologists believe the Purusha Suktam to be a later addition, possibly as a charter myth. Stephanie Jamison and Joel Brereton, a professor of Sanskrit and Religious studies, state, "there is no evidence in the Rigveda for an elaborate, much-subdivided and overarching caste system", and "the varna system seems to be embryonic in the Rigveda and, both then and later, a social ideal rather than a social reality".

Ram Sharan Sharma states that "the Rig Vedic society was neither organized on the basis of social division of labour nor on that of differences in wealth ... [it] was primarily organised on the basis of kin, tribe and lineage."

In the post-Vedic period, the varna division is described in the Dharmashastra literature, the Mahabharata and in the Puranas.

The Dharmasastras 

The varna system is extensively discussed in the Dharma-shastras. The Varna system in Dharma-shastras divides society into four varnas (Brahmins, Kshatriyas, Vaishya and Shudras). Those who fall out of this system because of their grievous sins are ostracised as outcastes (untouchables) and considered outside the varna system. Barbarians and those who are unrighteous or unethical are also considered outcastes.

Recent scholarship suggests that the discussion of varna as well as untouchable outcastes in these texts does not resemble the modern era caste system in India. Patrick Olivelle, a professor of Sanskrit and Indian Religions and credited with modern translations of Vedic literature, Dharma-sutras and Dharma-shastras, states that ancient and medieval Indian texts do not support the ritual pollution, purity-impurity as the basis for varna system. According to Olivelle, purity-impurity is discussed in the Dharma-shastra texts, but only in the context of the individual's moral, ritual and biological pollution (eating certain kinds of food such as meat, urination and defecation). In his review of Dharma-shastras, Olivelle writes, "we see no instance when a term of pure/impure is used with reference to a group of individuals or a varna or caste". The only mention of impurity in the Shastra texts from the 1st millennium is about people who commit grievous sins and thereby fall out of their varna. These, writes Olivelle, are called "fallen people" and impure, declaring that they be ostracised. Olivelle adds that the overwhelming focus in matters relating to purity/impurity in the Dharma-sastra texts concerns "individuals irrespective of their varna affiliation" and all four varnas could attain purity or impurity by the content of their character, ethical intent, actions, innocence or ignorance, stipulations, and ritualistic behaviours.

Olivelle states: 

The first three varnas are described in the Dharmashastras as "twice born" and they are allowed to study the Vedas. Such a restriction of who can study Vedas is not found in the Vedic era literature.

Manusmriti assigns cattle rearing as Vaishya occupation but historical evidence shows that Brahmins, Kshatriyas and Shudras also owned and reared cattle and that cattle-wealth was mainstay of their households. Ramnarayan Rawat, a professor of History and specialising in social exclusion in the Indian subcontinent, states that 19th century British records show that Chamars, listed as untouchables, also owned land and cattle and were active agriculturalists. The emperors of Kosala and the prince of Kasi are other examples.

Tim Ingold, an anthropologist, writes that the Manusmriti is a highly schematic commentary on the varna system, but it too provides "models rather than descriptions". Susan Bayly states that Manusmriti and other scriptures helped elevate Brahmin in the social hierarchy and these were a factor in the making of the varna system, but the ancient texts did not in some way "create the phenomenon of caste" in India.

The Upanishads 
The Chandogya Upanishad indicates that varna is allocated on the basis of one's birth and previous birth:

The Vajrasuchi Upanishad, however, states that the status of brahman is not based on birth, knowledge, or karma, but on the direct realisation of one's own Atman (inner self, soul).

The Epics 
The Mahabharata, estimated to have been completed by about the 4th century CE, discusses the Varna system in section 12.181.

The Epic offers two models on Varna. The first model describes Varna as colour-coded system, through a sage named Bhrigu, "Brahmins Varna was white, Kshtriyas was red, Vaishyas was yellow, and the Shudras' black". This description is questioned by another prominent sage Bharadwaja who says that colours are seen among all the Varnas, that desire, anger, fear, greed, grief, anxiety, hunger and toil prevails over all human beings, that bile and blood flow from all human bodies, so what distinguishes the Varnas, he asks? The Mahabharata then declares, according to Alf Hiltebeitel, a professor of religion, "There is no distinction of Varnas. This whole universe is Brahman. It was created formerly by Brahma, came to be classified by acts."

The Mahabharata thereafter recites a behavioural model for Varna, that those who were inclined to anger, pleasures and boldness attained the Kshatriya Varna; those who were inclined to cattle rearing and living off the plough attained the Vaishyas; those who were fond of violence, covetousness and impurity attained the Shudras. The Brahmin class is modelled in the epic, as the archetype default state of man dedicated to truth, austerity and pure conduct. Indeed, it goes on to assert that all men are children of Brahmins, which does not make sense, unless understood this way.In the Mahabharata and pre-medieval era Hindu texts, according to Hiltebeitel, "it is important to recognize, in theory, Varna is nongenealogical. The four Varnas are not lineages, but categories."

The Bhagavad Gita describe the professions, duties and qualities of members of different varnas.

Varna in Buddhist texts 

Ancient Buddhist texts mention Varna system in South Asia, but the details suggest that it was non-rigid, flexible and with characteristics devoid of features of a social stratification system.

Digha Nikaya provides a discussion between Gotama Buddha and a Hindu Brahmin named Sonadanda who was very learned in the Vedas.
Gotama Buddha asks, "By how many qualities do Brahmins recognize another Brahmin? How would one declare truthfully and without falling into falsehood, "I am a Brahmin?"
Sonadanda initially lists five qualities as, "he is of pure descent on both the mother's and the father's side, he is well versed in mantras, he is of fair color handsome and pleasing, he is virtuous learned and wise, and he is the first or second to hold the sacrificial ladle". 
Buddha then asks the Brahmin, "If we omit one of these qualities you just listed, could not one be still a true Brahmin?" 
Sonadanda, one by one, eliminates fair colour and looks, then eliminates Varna in which one was born, and then eliminates the ability to recite mantra and do sacrifices as a requirement of being a Brahmin.
Sonadanda asserts that just two qualities are necessary to truthfully and without falling into falsehood identify a Brahmin; these two qualities are "being virtuous and being learned and wise". Sonadanda adds that it is impossible to reduce the requirement for being a Brahmin any further, because "for wisdom is purified by morality, and morality is purified by wisdom; where one is, the other is, the moral man has wisdom and the wise man has morality, and the combination of morality and wisdom is called the highest thing in the world". Brian Black and Dean Patton state Sonadanda admits after this, "we [Brahmins] only know this much Gotama; it would be well if Reverend Gotama would explain meaning of the two [morality, wisdom]".

Peter Masefield, a Buddhism scholar and ancient Pali texts translator, states that during the Nikāya texts period of Buddhism (3rd century BC to 5th century AD), Varna as a class system is attested, but the described Varna was not a caste system. The Pali texts enumerate the four Varnas  Brahmin, "Kshatriya",Vessa (Vaishya) and Sudda (Shudra). Masefield notes that people in any Varna could in principle perform any profession. The early Buddhist texts, for instance, identify some Brahmins to be farmers and in other professions. The text state that anyone, of any birth, could perform the priestly function, and that the Brahmin took food from anyone, suggesting that strictures of commensality were as yet unknown. The Nikaya texts also imply that endogamy was not mandated in ancient India. Masefield concludes, "if any form of caste system was known during the Nikaya period - and it is doubtful that it was - this was in all probability restricted to certain non-Aryan groups".

Varna in Jain texts 

Ādi purāṇa, an 8th-century text of Jainism by Jinasena, is the earliest mention of Varna and Jati in Jainism literature. Jinasena does not trace the origin of Varna system to Rigveda or to Purusha Sukta, instead traces varna to the Bharata legend. According to this legend, Bharata performed an "ahimsa-test" (test of non-violence), and those members of his community who refused to harm or hurt any living being were called as the priestly varna in ancient India, and Bharata called them dvija, twice born. Jinasena states that those who are committed to ahimsa are deva-Brāhmaṇas, divine Brahmins.

The text Adi purana also discusses the relationship between varna and jati. According to Padmanabh Jaini, a professor of Indic studies, Jainism and Buddhism, the Adi purana text states "there is only one jati called manusyajati or the human caste, but divisions arise account of their different professions". The varna of Kshatriya arose when Rishabh procured weapons to serve the society and assumed the powers of a king, while Vaishya and Shudra varna arose from different means of livelihood in which they specialised.

Varna in Sikh texts 

Sikhism is a late 15th-century religion that originated in the Punjab region of the Indian subcontinent. Sikh texts mention Varna as Varan, and Jati as Zat or Zat-biradari. Eleanor Nesbitt, a professor of Religion and specialising in Christian, Hindu and Sikh studies, states that the Varan is described as a class system in 18th- to 20th-century Sikh literature, while Zat reflected the endogamous occupational groups (caste).

The Sikh texts authored by the Sikh Gurus and by non-Sikh Bhagats such as the Namdev, Ravidas and Kabir, states Nesbitt, declared the irrelevance of varan or zat of one's birth to one's spiritual destiny. They taught that "all of humanity had a single refuge" and that the divine teaching is for everyone. Sikhism teaches a society without any varan. In practice, states Harjot Oberoi, secondary Sikh texts such as the Khalsa Dharam Sastar in 1914 argued that the entry of certain Sikh castes into major Sikh shrines should be barred. Similarly, in practice and its texts, the Gurus of Sikhism did not condemn or break with the convention of marrying (and marrying off their children) within the jati, and all the Sikh Gurus were Khatri, had Khatri wives and practiced arranged marriages within their zat. According to Dhavan, the Rahit-namas and other prescriptive Sikh texts from mid-18th century onwards accommodate and affirm the "natal and marriage traditions of different caste groups within the Sikh community".

Ravidassi Sikhs and Ramgarhia Sikhs follow their own textual and festive traditions, gather in their own places of worship. These are varan-based (caste-based) religious congregations that emerged from Sikhism, states Nesbitt. The Ravidassia group, for example, emphasizes the teachings of Bhagat Ravidas – a poet-saint born in a family whose traditional untouchable occupation related to dead animals and leather. They consider the teachings of living Gurus and the texts of Ravidass Dera as sacred and spiritually as important as the historic Sikh Gurus. This is rejected by Khalsa Sikhs. The disagreements have led the Ravidassia Sikhs to launch the Ravidassia religion movement which, amongst other things seeks to replace the Guru Granth Sahib in their Gurdwaras with the texts of Ravidas.

Varna and jāti 

The terms varna (theoretical classification based on occupation) and jāti (caste) are two distinct concepts. Jāti (community) refers to the thousands of endogamous groups prevalent across the subcontinent. A jati may be divided into exogamous groups based on the same gotras. The classical authors scarcely speak of anything other than the varnas; even Indologists sometimes confuse the two.

See also 

 Dalit ('untouchables')
 Adi Dravida
 Classical Hindu law
 Four occupations – fourfold Confucian division
 Hindu law
 Hindu reform movements
 Manuvāda
 Trifunctional hypothesis

References

Bibliography

Further reading 
 
 
 
 
 
 
 
 

 
Social classes